The 2014–15 Football League Two (referred to as the Sky Bet League Two for sponsorship reasons) was the 11th season of the Football League Two under its current title and the 23rd season under its current league division format. The season began on 9 August 2014.

Twenty four clubs participated, eighteen of which remained in League Two having been neither promoted nor relegated at the end of the  2013–14 season. These clubs were joined by Tranmere Rovers, Carlisle United, Shrewsbury Town and Stevenage who were relegated from 2013–14 Football League One, and by Luton Town and Cambridge United who were both promoted from the 2013–14 Football Conference.

Burton Albion won the League Two title after a 3–2 away to Cambridge United on 2 May.

Changes from last season

Team changes
The following teams changed division at the end of the 2013–14 season.

To League Two
Promoted from Conference Premier
 Luton Town
 Cambridge United
Relegated from Football League One
 Tranmere Rovers
 Carlisle United
 Shrewsbury Town
 Stevenage

From League Two
Relegated to Conference Premier
 Bristol Rovers
 Torquay United
Promoted to Football League One
 Chesterfield
 Scunthorpe United
 Rochdale
 Fleetwood Town

Team overview

Stadia and locations

Managerial changes

League table

Play-offs

Results

Top scorers

Notes

References 

 
EFL League Two seasons
3
4
Eng